The following is a complete episode list of 2000s and 2010s US television documentary series Chasing Classic Cars starring Wayne Carini, who finds and chases classic cars from all eras, with the option of restoration and a likely sale.

Series overview

Episodes

Season 1 (2008–09)

Season 2 (2009)

Season 3 (2010)

Season 4 (2011)

Season 5 (2012–13)

Season 6 (2013–14)

Season 7 (2014)

Season 8 (2015)

Season 9 (2015-2016)

Season 10 (2016)

Season 11 (2017)

Season 12 (2017)

Season 13 (2018)

Season 14 (2019)

Season 15 (2020)

Season 16 (2020)

Season 17 (2021)

References 

Lists of American non-fiction television series episodes
Lists of reality television series episodes